Metacrambus kurdistanellus is a moth in the family Crambidae. It was described by Hans Georg Amsel in 1959 and is found in Iraq.

References

Crambinae
Moths described in 1959